Parlor Hawk is the second full-length eponymous album by indie rock band Parlor Hawk.  It was released on February 18, 2014.  The album was produced by GRAMMY nominated composer and friend Nate Pyfer (Kaskade, The Moth & the Flame).  It was mixed by Scott Wiley (Elvis Costello, Neon Trees) and mastered by Joe Lambert (The National, Local Natives, Animal Collective).

Media usage
Tracks "Better Gone" and "We Better Run" featured in the season 6 finale of Sons of Anarchy.  Track "Scars" featured in the Switched at Birth season 3 episode "The Scream".  Track "Silhouette" featured on Teen Mom 2 (2014).  NoiseTrade featured the album the week of March 25, 2014.

Music video
The "Maryanne" music video debuted on August 30, 2013.  It was directed by Jonathan Frey and filmed on a Canon 5D Mark II.  The video centers on a man and the widow of his recently deceased brother.  The song is about losing a loved one and learning to cope with the people you still have as evidenced by the lyrics “Maryanne, please take my hand, though it is hard for you and I don’t understand.”

Track listing

Personnel
Parlor Hawk
Andrew Clifford Capener– vocals, rhythm guitar
TJ Nockleby– guitar
Andrew Dyer– bass 
Mark Garbett– piano, additional vocals
Jay Tibbitts– drums

References

2014 albums
Parlor Hawk albums